The following is a list of films and other media in which Betty Boop has appeared. She was featured in 126 theatrical cartoons between 1930 and 1939 (90 in her own series and 36 in the Talkartoons and Screen Songs series). All of them were released by many labels but there were no such releases for the Betty Boop cartoons on DVD and Blu-ray, up until 2013 when Olive Films released the non-public domain cartoons in four "Essential Collection" volumes, although they were restored from the original television internegatives that carried the altered opening and closing credits. Volume 1 was released on August 20, 2013, and Volume 2 on September 24, 2013. Volume 3 was released on April 29, 2014, and Volume 4 on September 30, 2014. In May 2022, animator and archivist Steve Stanchfield released a Blu-Ray collection titled "The Other Betty Boop Cartoons, Volume 1" through his label Thunderbean Animation,  which features public domain cartoons that were not on the Olive Films sets. It includes the long-lost recently discovered cartoon Honest Love and True.

Appearances in Talkartoons and Screen Songs series
Note: see the Talkartoons and Screen Songs filmography for additional entries in the series.

Betty Boop series

Television films

Source:

Other appearances
Betty Boop made an appearance in the 1988 film Who Framed Roger Rabbit.

References